Jang Jo-yoon (born 1 January 1988), alternatively spelt as Chang Jo-yoon, is a retired South Korean footballer who plays as a forward.

While he started out initially as a midfielder while playing in his youth for Jeonbuk Hyundai Motors, he started playing as a striker after he moved to S.League side, Super Reds FC in 2009.

Club career

Jang spent his first two seasons as a professional player with K.League side Jeonbuk Hyundai Motors in his native South Korea, the first club he signed for when he was fresh out of high school.

In 2009, he was given an opportunity to move to Singapore to play for the all-Korean team, Super Reds FC, in the S.League.

When the Super Reds were denied a place in the 2010 S.League, Jang headed west with compatriot Park Kang-jin to join Gombak United where he would feature prominently for the Bulls, scoring a total of fourteen goals in the S.League and one each in the Singapore Cup and Singapore League Cup.

He was then transferred to Balestier Khalsa in 2012 but found little playing time under Tigers coach, Darren Stewart.

In December 2012, it was noted that Jang was on trial with Woodlands Wellington when he was featured in the Rams' lineup against Darul Takzim FC in a pre-season friendly. Jang scored a goal in that match and set up another goal for fellow Korean Moon Soon-ho in a subsequent friendly game against SAFFC. On 11 January 2013, it was announced that Jang had been confirmed by the club for the 2013 season.

He made his debut for Woodlands Wellington on 21 February 2013 in a 2–2 draw against Warriors F.C., assisting in Khalid Hamdaoui's 72nd-minute goal.

Jang scored his first Woodlands Wellington goal by firing home the winning goal off Taufiq Rahmat's corner kick a S.League match against Albirex Niigata (S) on 27 March 2013, helping the Rams beat the White Swans with a 2–1 scoreline. He also created a goal for Khalid Hamdaoui in the same match.

He joined Hougang United in July 2018. He scored his first goal for Hougang in a 3-1 win against Geylang International on 5 August 2018.

On 19 July 2019, He announced his retirement from football on his Facebook. Ending his 22 years career in football.

Club career statistics

Chang Jo-yoon's Profile

All numbers encased in brackets signify substitute appearances.

References

AsiaOne.com

External links

1988 births
Living people
South Korean footballers
South Korean expatriate footballers
Jeonbuk Hyundai Motors players
Gombak United FC players
Balestier Khalsa FC players
Woodlands Wellington FC players
Chungju Hummel FC players
K League 1 players
K League 2 players
Korea National League players
Singapore Premier League players
Expatriate footballers in Singapore
South Korean expatriate sportspeople in Singapore
Association football forwards